Charles Robert Hawkins (born October 17, 1943) is a former American politician. A Republican, he most recently served as Chair of the Virginia Tobacco Commission and was also previously a member of the Virginia Senate from 1992 until 2008. Prior to this, he was a member of the Virginia House of Delegates from the 21st District from 1982 until 1991.

References
 House of Delegates Biography
 IALR Building Named for Charles Hawkins
 Kilgore Elected Chair of Virginia Tobacco Commission

1943 births
Living people
Republican Party Virginia state senators
Republican Party members of the Virginia House of Delegates
University of Virginia alumni
Politicians from Danville, Virginia